The Illinois campaign, also known as Clark's Northwestern campaign, was a series of engagements during the American Revolutionary War in which a small force of Virginia militia led by George Rogers Clark seized control of several British posts in the Illinois Country of the Province of Quebec, located in modern-day Illinois and Indiana in the Midwestern United States. The campaign is the best-known action of the western theater of the war and the source of Clark's reputation as an early American military hero.

In July 1778, Clark and his men crossed the Ohio River from Kentucky and took control of Kaskaskia, Vincennes, and several other villages in British territory. The occupation was accomplished without firing a shot because many of the Canadien and Native American inhabitants in the region were unwilling to resist the Patriots. To counter Clark's advance, Henry Hamilton, the British lieutenant governor at Fort Detroit, reoccupied Vincennes with a small force. In February 1779, Clark returned to Vincennes in a surprise winter expedition and retook the town, capturing Hamilton in the process. Virginia capitalized on Clark's success by establishing the region as Illinois County, Virginia.

The importance of the Illinois campaign has been the subject of much debate. Because the British ceded the entire Northwest Territory to the United States in the 1783 Treaty of Paris, some historians have credited Clark with nearly doubling the size of the original Thirteen Colonies by seizing control of the Illinois Country during the war. For this reason, Clark was nicknamed the "Conqueror of the Northwest", and his Illinois campaign—particularly the surprise march to Vincennes—was greatly celebrated and romanticized.

Background 

The Illinois Country was a vaguely defined region which included much of the present U.S. states of Indiana and Illinois. The area had been a part of the Louisiana district of New France until the end of the French and Indian War/Seven Years' War, when France ceded sovereignty of the region to the British in 1763 Treaty of Paris. In the Quebec Act of 1774, the British made the Illinois country a part of its newly expanded Province of Quebec.

In 1778, the population of the Illinois Country consisted of about 1,000 people of European descent, mostly French-speaking, and about 600 African-American slaves. Thousands of American Indians lived in villages concentrated along the Mississippi, Illinois, and Wabash Rivers. The British military presence was sparse: most of the troops had been withdrawn in 1776 to cut back on expenses. Philippe-François de Rastel de Rocheblave, a French-born soldier and official, was hired by the British to be the local commandant, of Fort Gage, in Kaskaskia. Rocheblave reported to Hamilton at Fort Detroit, and frequently complained that he lacked the money, resources, and troops needed to administer and protect the French villages and forts, from internal and external enemies, within the region.

When the American Revolutionary War began, in 1775, the Ohio River marked the border between the Illinois Country and Kentucky, an area recently settled by American colonists. The British had originally sought to keep American Indians out of the war, but in 1777 Hamilton received instructions to recruit and arm Indian war parties to raid white settlements on the Kentucky frontier, opening a western front in the war. "From 1777 on," wrote historian Bernard Sheehan, "the line of western settlements was under almost constant assault by white-led [Indian] raiding parties that had originated at Detroit."

In 1777, George Rogers Clark was a 25-year-old major in the Kentucky County, Virginia, militia. Clark believed that he could end the raids on Kentucky by capturing the British posts in the Illinois Country and then moving against Detroit. In April 1777, Clark sent two spies into the Illinois country. They returned after two months and reported that the fort at Kaskaskia was unguarded, that the French-speaking residents were not greatly attached to the British, and that no one expected an attack from Kentucky. Clark wrote a letter to Governor Patrick Henry of Virginia in which he outlined a plan to capture Kaskaskia.

Planning 

Because the Kentucky settlers lacked the authority, manpower, and supplies to launch the expedition themselves, in October 1777 Clark traveled to Williamsburg via the Wilderness Road to meet with Governor Henry, joining along the way a party of about 100 settlers who were leaving Kentucky because of the Indian raids. Clark presented his plan to Governor Henry on December 10, 1777. To maintain secrecy, Clark's proposal was only shared with a small group of influential Virginians, including Thomas Jefferson, George Mason, and George Wythe. Although Henry initially expressed doubts about whether the campaign was feasible, Clark managed to win the confidence of Henry and the others. The plan was approved by the members of the Virginia General Assembly, who were only given vague details about the expedition. Publicly, Clark was authorized to raise men for the defense of Kentucky. In a secret set of instructions from Governor Henry, Clark was instructed to capture Kaskaskia and then proceed as he saw fit.

Governor Henry commissioned Clark as a lieutenant colonel in the Virginia militia and authorized him to raise seven militia companies, each to contain fifty men. This unit, later known as the Illinois Regiment, was a part of the Virginia State Forces and thus, not a part of the Continental Army, the national army of the United States, during the Revolutionary War. The men were enlisted to serve for three months, after they reached Kentucky. To maintain secrecy, Clark did not tell any of his recruits that the purpose of the expedition was to invade the Illinois Country. To raise men and purchase supplies, Clark was given £1,200 in Continental currency, which was badly inflated, especially because of British counterfeiting measures at the time.

Clark established his headquarters at Redstone Old Fort on the Monongahela River, while three of Clark's associates from Dunmore's War, Joseph Bowman, Leonard Helm, and William Harrod, each began to recruit men. Clark commissioned Captain William Bailey Smith as a major, and gave him £150 to recruit four companies in the Holston River valley and then meet Clark in Kentucky.

For a variety of reasons, Clark was unable to raise all 350 men authorized for the Illinois Regiment. His recruiters had to compete with recruiters from the Continental Army and from other militia units. Some believed that Kentucky was too sparsely inhabited to warrant the diversion of manpower, and recommended that it should be evacuated rather than defended. Settlers in the Holston valley were more concerned with Cherokees to the south than with Indians north of the Ohio, and were reluctant to enlist in operations to the north. Although some Pennsylvanians enlisted in the Illinois Regiment, the longstanding boundary dispute between Pennsylvania and Virginia meant that few Pennsylvanians volunteered for what was perceived as a campaign to protect Virginia territory.

Clark's journey down the Ohio 

After repeated delays to allow time for more men to join, Clark left Redstone by boat on May 12, 1778, with about 150 recruits, organized in three companies under captains Bowman, Helm, and Harrod. Clark expected to rendezvous with 200 Holston men under Captain Smith at the Falls of the Ohio in Kentucky. Traveling with Clark's men were about 20 families who were going to Kentucky to settle.

On the journey down the Ohio River, Clark and his men picked up supplies at Forts Pitt and Henry that were provided by General Edward Hand, the Continental Army Western Department commander. They reached Fort Randolph (Point Pleasant, West Virginia) soon after it had been attacked by an Indian war party. The fort commander asked for Clark's help in pursuing the raiders, but Clark declined, believing that he could not spare the time.

As he was nearing the Falls of the Ohio, Clark stopped at the mouth of the Kentucky River and sent a message upriver to Major Smith, telling him that it was time to rendezvous. Clark soon learned, however, that of Smith's four promised companies, only one partial company under a Captain Dillard had arrived in Kentucky. Clark therefore sent word to Colonel John Bowman, the senior militia officer in Kentucky, requesting that the colonel send Dillard's men and any other recruits he could find to the falls.

Clark's little flotilla reached the Falls of the Ohio on May 27. He set up a base camp on a small island in the midst of the rapids, later known as Corn Island. When the additional recruits from Kentucky and Holston finally arrived, Clark added 20 of these men to his force, and sent the others back to Kentucky to help defend the settlements. The new recruits were placed in a company under Captain John Montgomery. In Montgomery's company was a scout named Simon Kenton, who was on his way to becoming a legendary Kentucky frontiersman. On the island, Clark revealed that the real purpose of the expedition was to invade the Illinois country. The news was greeted with enthusiasm by many, but some of the Holston men deserted that night; seven or eight were caught and brought back, but others eluded capture and returned to their homes.

While Clark and his officers drilled the troops in preparation for the Kaskaskia expedition, the families who had traveled with the regiment down the Ohio River settled on the island and planted a corn crop. These settlers moved to the mainland the following year, founding the settlement which became Louisville. While on the island, Clark received an important message from Pittsburgh: France had signed a Treaty of Alliance with the United States. Clark hoped that this information would be useful in securing the allegiance of the Canadien inhabitants of the Illinois country.

Occupation of the Illinois Country 

Clark and his men set off from Corn Island on June 24, 1778, leaving behind seven soldiers who were deemed not hardy enough for the journey. These men stayed with the families on the island and guarded the provisions stored there. Clark's force numbered about 175 men, organized in four companies under Captains Bowman, Helm, Harrod, and Montgomery. They passed over the whitewater of the falls during a total solar eclipse, which some of the men regarded as a good omen.

On June 28, the Illinois Regiment reached the mouth of the Tennessee River, where they landed on an island and prepared for the final stage of the journey. Normally, travelers going to Kaskaskia would continue to the Mississippi River, and then paddle upstream to the village. Clark's men captured a boatload of American hunters led by John Duff who had recently been at Kaskaskia; they provided Clark with intelligence about the village and agreed to join the expedition as guides. That evening, Clark and his troops landed their vessels on the north side of the Ohio River, near the ruins of Fort Massac, a French fort abandoned after the French and Indian War (near present Metropolis, Illinois).

The men marched  through forest before emerging into prairie. When a guide announced that he was lost, Clark suspected treachery and threatened to kill the man unless he found the way. The guide regained his bearings, and the trek resumed. They arrived outside Kaskaskia on the night of July 4. Thinking they would have arrived sooner, the men had carried only four days worth of rations; they had gone without food for the last two days of the six-day march. "In our hungry condition," wrote Joseph Bowman, "we unanimously determined to take the town or die in the attempt."

They crossed the Kaskaskia River about midnight and quickly secured the city without firing a shot. At Fort Gage, the Virginians captured Rocheblave, who was sleeping in his bed when the Americans burst into the lightly guarded fort. The next morning, Clark worked to secure the allegiance of the townspeople, a task made easier because Clark brought news of the Franco-American alliance. Residents were asked to take oath of loyalty to Virginia and the United States. Father Pierre Gibault, the village priest, was won over after Clark assured him that the Catholic Church would be protected under the laws of Virginia. Rocheblave and several others deemed hostile to the Americans were kept as prisoners and later sent to Virginia.

Clark soon extended his authority to the nearby French settlements. On the afternoon of July 5, Captain Bowman was sent with 30 mounted men, along with some citizens of Kaskaskia, to secure Prairie du Rocher, St. Philippe, and Cahokia. The towns offered no resistance, and within 10 days more than 300 people had taken the American oath of allegiance. When Clark turned his attention to Vincennes, Father Gibault offered to help. On July 14, Gibault and a few companions set out on horseback for Vincennes. There, most of the citizens agreed to take the oath of allegiance, and the local militia garrisoned Fort Sackville. Gibault returned to Clark in early August to report that Vincennes had been captured and that the American flag was now flying at Fort Sackville. Clark dispatched Captain Helm to Vincennes to take command of the Canadien militia.

Hamilton retakes Vincennes 
In Detroit, Hamilton learned of Clark's occupation of the Illinois Country by early August 1778. Determined to retake Vincennes, Hamilton gathered about 30 British soldiers, 145 Canadien militiamen, and 60 American Indians under Egushawa, the influential Odawa war leader. An advance party of militiamen was led by Captain Normand MacLeod of the Detroit Volunteer Militia. Coming down the Wabash, they stopped at Ouiatanon and recruited Indians who had declared allegiance to the Americans after Clark's occupation of the Illinois country. By the time Hamilton entered Vincennes on December 17, so many Indians had joined the expedition that his force had increased to 500 men. As Hamilton approached Fort Sackville, the Canadien militia under Captain Helm deserted, leaving the American commander and a few soldiers to surrender. The townsfolk promptly renounced their allegiance to the United States and renewed their oaths to King George.

After the recapture of Vincennes, most of the Indians and Detroit Militia went home. Hamilton settled in at Fort Sackville, for the winter, with a garrison of about 90 soldiers, planning to retake the remaining Illinois towns, along the Mississippi River, in the spring.

Clark's trek to Vincennes 

On January 29, 1779, Francis Vigo, an Italian fur trader, came to Kaskaskia to inform Clark about Hamilton's reoccupation of Vincennes. Clark decided that he needed to launch a surprise winter attack on Vincennes before Hamilton could recapture the Illinois country in the spring. He wrote to Governor Henry:

I know the case is desperate; but, sir, we must either quit the country or attack Mr. Hamilton. No time is to be lost. Were I sure of a reinforcement, I should not attempt it. Who knows what fortune will do for us? Great things have been effected by a few men well conducted. Perhaps we may be fortunate. We have this consolation, that our cause is just, and that our country will be grateful and not condemn our conduct in case we fall through. If we fail, the Illinois as well as Kentucky, I believe, is lost.

On February 6, 1779, Clark set out for Vincennes with probably about 170 volunteers, nearly half of them French militia from Kaskaskia. Captain Bowman was second-in-command on the expedition, which Clark characterized as a "forlorn hope." While Clark and his men marched across country, 40 men left in an armed row-galley, which was to be stationed on the Wabash River below Vincennes to prevent the British from escaping by water.

It was not a cold winter, but it rained frequently, and the plains were often covered with several inches of water. Provisions were carried on packhorses, supplemented by wild game the men shot as they traveled. They built a large canoe to shuttle men and supplies across. The next few days were especially trying: provisions were running low, and the men were almost continually wading through water. They reached the Embarras River on February 17. They were now only  from Fort Sackville, but the river was too high to ford. They followed the  down to the Wabash River, where the next day they began to build boats. Spirits were low: they had been without food for last two days, and Clark struggled to keep men from deserting.

On February 20, five hunters from Vincennes were captured while traveling by boat. They told Clark that his little army had not yet been detected, and that the people of Vincennes were still sympathetic to the Americans. The next day, Clark and his men crossed the Wabash by canoe, leaving their packhorses behind. They marched towards Vincennes, sometimes in water up to their shoulders. Shortly before reaching Vincennes, they encountered a villager known to be a friend, who informed Clark that they were still unsuspected. Clark sent the man ahead with a letter to the inhabitants of Vincennes, warning them that he was just about to arrive with an army, and that everyone should stay in their homes unless they wanted to be considered an enemy. The message was read in the public square. No one went to the fort to warn Hamilton.

Siege of Fort Sackville 

Clark and his men marched into Vincennes at sunset on February 23, entering the town in two divisions, one commanded by Clark and the other by Bowman. Taking advantage of a slight elevation of land which concealed his men but allowed their flags to be seen, Clark maneuvered his troops to create the impression that 1,000 men were approaching. While Clark and Bowman secured the town, a detachment was sent to begin firing at Fort Sackville after their wet black powder was replaced by local resident François Busseron. Despite the commotion, Hamilton did not realize the fort was under attack until one of his men was wounded by a bullet coming through a window.

Clark had his men build an entrenchment  in front of the fort's gate. While men fired at the fort throughout the night, small squads crept up to within  of the walls to get a closer shot. The British fired their cannon, destroying a few houses in the city but doing little damage to the besiegers. Clark's men silenced the cannon by firing through the fort's portholes, killing and wounding some of the gunners. Meanwhile, Clark received local help: villagers gave him powder and ammunition they had hidden from the British, and Young Tobacco, a Piankeshaw chief, offered to have his 100 men assist in the attack. Clark declined the chief's offer, fearing that in the darkness his men might mistake the friendly Piankeshaws and Kickapoos for one of the enemy tribes that were in the area.

At about 9:00 a.m. on February 24, Clark sent a message to the fort demanding Hamilton's surrender. Hamilton declined, and the firing continued for another two hours until Hamilton sent out his prisoner, Captain Helm, to offer terms. Clark sent Helm back with a demand of unconditional surrender within 30 minutes, or else he would storm the fort. Helm returned before the time had expired and presented Hamilton's proposal for a three-day truce. This too was rejected, but Clark agreed to meet Hamilton at the village church.

Before the meeting at the church, the most controversial incident in Clark's career occurred. During these negotiations, a British-allied war party of between 15 and 20 Odawa and Lenape warriors, led by two Canadiens, neared Clark's encampments after leaving the Vincennes Trace. The party, which escorted two captive Canadien deserters in tow, had been ordered by Hamilton to  patrol the nearby area. Having been informed by his Kickapoo allies of the party's movements, Clark ordered a detachment of soldiers under the command of Captain John Williams to capture them. The war party mistakenly assumed Williams and his men were there to escort them into Fort Sackville, and greeted them by discharging their firearms. Williams responded by firing his weapon before seizing one of the Canadien leaders, which led the rest of the party to flee in panic; Williams' men opened fire, killing two, wounding three and capturing eight. The two deserters were released after being captured, and the remaining six captives consisted of a Canadien and five Indians. Clark ordered the five Indians to be murdered before the fort to terrify the British and sow dissension between them and their Indian allies.

At the church, Clark and Bowman met with Hamilton and signed terms of surrender. At 10:00 a.m. on February 25, Hamilton's garrison of 79 men marched out of the fort. Clark's men raised the American flag over the fort and renamed it Fort Patrick Henry. A team of Clark's soldiers and local militia was sent upriver on the Wabash, where a supply convoy was captured, along with British reinforcements and Philippe DeJean, Hamilton's judge in Detroit. Clark sent Hamilton, seven of his officers, and 18 other prisoners to Williamsburg. Canadiens who had accompanied Hamilton were paroled after taking an oath of neutrality.

Aftermath 

Clark had high hopes after his recapture of Vincennes. "This stroke", he said, "will nearly put an end to the Indian War." In the coming years of the war, Clark attempted to organize a campaign against Detroit, but each time the expedition was called off because of insufficient men and supplies. Meanwhile, settlers began to pour into Kentucky after hearing news of Clark's victory. In 1779, Virginia opened a land office to register claims in Kentucky, and settlements such as Louisville were established.

After learning of Clark's initial occupation of the Illinois Country, Virginia had claimed the region, establishing Illinois County, Virginia in December 1778. In early 1781, Virginia resolved to hand the region over to the central government, paving the way for the final ratification of the Articles of Confederation. These lands became the Northwest Territory of the United States.

The Illinois campaign was funded in large part by local residents and merchants of the Illinois country. Although Clark submitted his receipts to Virginia, many of these men were never reimbursed. Some of the major contributors, such as Father Gibault, François Riday Busseron, Charles Gratiot, and Francis Vigo, would never receive payment during their lifetime, and would be reduced to poverty.  However, Clark and his soldiers were given land across from Louisville. This Clark's Grant was based from what is now Clarksville, Indiana and formed much of what would become Clark and eastern Floyd County, Indiana.

In 1789, Clark began to write an account of the Illinois campaign at the request of John Brown and other members of the United States Congress, who were then deliberating how to administer the Northwest Territory. The Memoir, as it usually known, was not published in Clark's lifetime; although used by historians in the 19th century, it was not published in its entirety until 1896, in William Hayden English's Conquest of the Northwest. The Memoir formed the basis of two popular novels, Alice of Old Vincennes (1900) by Maurice Thompson, and The Crossing (1904) by American novelist Winston Churchill. The Illinois campaign was also depicted in Long Knife, a 1979 historical novel by James Alexander Thom. The United States Navy has named four ships USS Vincennes in honor of that battle.

The debate about whether George Rogers Clark "conquered" the Northwest Territory for the United States began soon after the Revolutionary War ended, when the government worked to sort out land claims and war debts. In July 1783, Governor Benjamin Harrison thanked Clark for "wresting so great and valuable a territory out of the hands of the British Enemy...." Clark himself never made such a claim, despairingly writing that he had never captured Detroit. "I have lost the object,” he said. In the 19th century and into the mid-20th century, Clark was frequently referred to as the "Conqueror of the Northwest" in history books. In the 20th century, however, some historians began to doubt that interpretation, arguing that because resource shortages compelled Clark to recall his troops from the Illinois Country before the end of the war, and because most American Indians remained undefeated, there was no "conquest" of the Northwest. It was further argued that Clark's activities had no effect on the boundary negotiations in Europe. In 1940, historian Randolph Downes wrote, "It is misleading to say that Clark 'conquered' the Old Northwest, or that he 'captured' Kaskaskia, Cahokia, and Vincennes. It would be more accurate to say that he assisted the French and Indian inhabitants of that region to remove themselves from the very shadowy political rule of the British."

See also 
 American Revolutionary War § Mississippi River theater. Places ' Illinois campaign ' in overall sequence and strategic context.

Notes

References 
Primary sources
Clark, George Rogers. Memoir. Published under various titles, including Col. George Rogers Clark's Sketch of his Campaign in the Illinois in 1778-9 (New York: Arno, 1971). An edition that standardizes Clark's erratic spelling and grammar for easier reading is The Conquest of the Illinois, edited by Milo M. Quaife (1920; reprinted Southern Illinois University Press, 2001; .)
Evans, William A., ed. Detroit to Fort Sackville, 1778–1779: The Journal of Normand MacLeod. Wayne State University Press, 1978. .
James, James Alton, ed. George Rogers Clark Papers. 2 vols. Originally published 1912–1926. Reprinted New York: AMS Press, 1972. .
Kellogg, Louise P., ed. Frontier Advance on the Upper Ohio, 1778–1779. Madison: State Society of Wisconsin, 1916.
Thwaites, Reuben G. and Louise P. Kellogg, eds. Frontier Defense on the Upper Ohio, 1777–1778. Originally published 1912; reprinted Millwood, New York: Kraus, 1977. .
Virginia. Auditor of Public Accounts (1776–1928). George Rogers Clark Papers, Western Expedition Quartermaster Records, 1778–1784. Accession APA 205. State government records collection, The Library of Virginia, Richmond, Virginia.

Secondary sources
Abernethy, Thomas Perkins. Western Lands and the American Revolution. Originally published 1937; reprinted New York: Russell & Russell, 1959.
 
Barnhart, John D. Henry Hamilton and George Rogers Clark in the American Revolution, with the Unpublished Journal of Lieut. Governor Henry Hamilton. Crawfordville, Indiana: Banta, 1951.
Butterfield, Consul W. History of George Rogers Clark's Conquest of the Illinois and the Wabash Towns 1778–1779. Columbus, Ohio: Heer, 1903.
Cayton, Andrew R. L. Frontier Indiana. Bloomington: Indiana University Press, 1999. .
 
Dowd, Gregory Evans. A Spirited Resistance: The North American Indian Struggle for Unity, 1745–1815. Baltimore: Johns Hopkins University Press, 1992. .
Downes, Randolph C. Council Fires on the Upper Ohio: A Narrative of Indian Affairs in the Upper Ohio Valley until 1795. Pittsburgh: University of Pittsburgh Press, 1940.  (1989 reprint).
English, William Hayden. Conquest of the Country Northwest of the River Ohio, 1778–1783, and Life of Gen. George Rogers Clark. 2 vols. Indianapolis: Bowen-Merrill, 1896.
Harrison, Lowell H. George Rogers Clark and the War in the West. Lexington: University Press of Kentucky, 1976. .
James, James Alton. The Life of George Rogers Clark. Chicago: University of Chicago Press, 1928. 
———. "The Northwest: Gift or Conquest?" Indiana Magazine of History 30 (March 1934): 1–15.
Sheehan, Bernard W. "'The Famous Hair Buyer General': Henry Hamilton, George Rogers Clark, and the American Indian." Indiana Magazine of History 69 (March 1983): 1–28.
Smith, Dwight L. "The Old Northwest and the Peace Negotiations" in The French, the Indians, and George Rogers Clark in the Illinois Country. Indianapolis: Indiana Historical Society, 1977.
White, Richard. The Middle Ground: Indians, Empires, and Republics in the Great Lakes Region, 1650–1815. Cambridge University Press, 1991. .

External links 
Links to primary documents online from the Indiana Historical Bureau, including Clark's memoir, Hamilton's diary, and Bowman's journal.
"Patrick Henry's secret orders to George Rogers Clark", from the Indiana Historical Society
"Index to the George Rogers Clark Papers – The Illinois Regiment", from the Sons of the Revolution in the State of Illinois
The Recreated Illinois Regiment – Virginia State Forces (NWTA) organization, American Revolutionary War reenactors
The Uniform of George Rogers Clark's Illinois Regiment of Virginia State Forces, From October 1778 through February 1779 (The period of the attack on Fort Sackville, Vincennes)

1778 in the United States
1779 in the United States
Conflicts in 1778
Conflicts in 1779
Virginia in the American Revolution
Campaigns of the American Revolutionary War
Illinois in the American Revolution
Indiana in the American Revolution
Pre-statehood history of Illinois
Pre-statehood history of Indiana
Battles in the Western theater of the American Revolutionary War
Ohio in the American Revolution